In mathematics, Denisyuk polynomials Den(x) or Mn(x) are generalizations of the Laguerre polynomials introduced by  given by the generating function

Notes

References

Polynomials